Lieutenant Colonel Arthur Martin-Leake,  (4 April 1874 – 22 June 1953) was a British physician, officer in the Royal Army Medical Corps and a double recipient of the Victoria Cross (VC), the highest award for gallantry in the face of the enemy that can be awarded to British and Commonwealth forces. Martin-Leake was the first of only three men to be awarded the VC twice, the others being Noel Godfrey Chavasse and Charles Upham.

Early life
Arthur, the fifth son of Stephen Martin-Leake of Thorpe Hall, Essex, was born at Standon, near Ware, Hertfordshire, and was educated at Westminster School before studying medicine at University College Hospital, qualifying in 1893.  He was employed at Hemel Hempstead District Hospital before enlisting in the 42nd (Hertfordshire) Company, Imperial Yeomanry in 1899 to serve in the Boer War.<ref>Lt-Col J.D. Sainsbury, The Hertfordshire Yeomanry: An Illustrated History' 1794–1920', Welwyn: Hertfordshire Yeomanry and Artillery Historical Trust/Hart Books, 1994, ISBN 0-948527-03-X, pp. 100–1.</ref>

Boer War

After his year of service as a trooper in the Imperial Yeomanry was completed, Martin-Leake stayed on in South Africa as a civil surgeon. He then joined the South African Constabulary until he was forced to return home due to his wounds.

He was 27 years old and a surgeon captain in the South African Constabulary attached to the 5th Field Ambulance during the Second Boer War on 8 February 1902, at Vlakfontein, when he was awarded his first VC.

He received the decoration from King Edward VII at St James's Palace on 2 June 1902.

Interbellum
Martin-Leake qualified as a Fellow of the Royal College of Surgeons in 1903 after studying while convalescing from wounds.  He then took up an appointment in India as Chief Medical Officer with the Bengal-Nagpur Railway.

In 1912, he volunteered to serve with the British Red Cross during the Balkan Wars, attached to the Montenegran army, and was present during the Siege of Scutari (1912–13) and at Tarabosh Mountain.  He was awarded the Order of the Montenegran Red Cross.

First World War
On the outbreak of the First World War, Martin-Leake returned to service as a lieutenant with the 5th Field Ambulance, Royal Army Medical Corps, on the Western Front.

He was awarded his second VC, aged 40, during the period 29 October to 8 November 1914 near Zonnebeke, Belgium, whilst serving with the Royal Army Medical Corps, British Army.

His award citation reads:

His Victoria Cross is displayed at the Army Medical Services Museum, Aldershot, England.

He was promoted captain in March 1915, major in November the same year, and in April 1917 took command of 46th Field Ambulance at the rank of lieutenant colonel.

Postwar
Martin-Leake retired from the army after the war and resumed his company employment in India until he retired to England in 1937. Although there is no record of his being a pilot, he was registered in 1939 as the owner of a de Havilland Moth Minor aircraft, registered G-AFRY.

During the Second World War, he commanded an ARP post.

He died, aged 79, at High Cross, Hertfordshire. Following cremation at Enfield Crematorium, Middlesex, Martin-Leake was buried in St John's Church, High Cross. He is commemorated with a plaque and a tree at the National Memorial Arboretum in Alrewas, Staffordshire.

References

External links

Location of grave and VC medal (Hertfordshire)''

1874 births
1953 deaths
People educated at Westminster School, London
Deaths from lung cancer
Second Boer War recipients of the Victoria Cross
British World War I recipients of the Victoria Cross
British Army personnel of World War I
Royal Army Medical Corps officers
British Yeomanry soldiers
Imperial Yeomanry soldiers
British Army personnel of the Second Boer War
People from East Hertfordshire District
British Army recipients of the Victoria Cross
Recipients of the Victoria Cross
Alumni of the UCL Medical School
Civil Defence Service personnel
Military personnel from Hertfordshire
Burials in Hertfordshire